Hans Rottensteiner (born 1 June 1901, date of death unknown) was an Austrian bobsledder who competed in the mid-1930s. He finished 13th in the two-man event at the 1936 Winter Olympics in Garmisch-Partenkirchen.

References
1936 bobsleigh two-man results
Hans Rottensteiner's profile at Sports Reference.com

Austrian male bobsledders
Olympic bobsledders of Austria
Bobsledders at the 1936 Winter Olympics
1901 births
Year of death missing